is a Japanese Enka singer and businessman, of Iwate Prefecture, known for the song 'Kitaguni no Haru' ('North Country Spring'). He is affiliated with the talent agency NoReason Inc.

Career

In 1977, he released his greatest hit,  ('North Country Spring'). It won the "Long Seller Award" at the 21st Japan Record Awards, sold 3 million copies, and was covered by notable artists such as Aki Yashiro, Teresa Teng, and Misora Hibari.

Personal life

Masao is the second son in a rural agricultural household and deliberately stressed his poor country origins as part of his image.

He reportedly had a taste for blondes, and in 1972 married American jazz singer .

During the Bubble era, he became extremely wealthy, owning a Rolls-Royce and living in a luxurious, 13-room home.

References

External links
Official profile at NoReason Inc.

1947 births
Japanese-language singers
Musicians from Iwate Prefecture
Living people